Patrick James Jones (7 September 1920 – December 1990) was a former English professional footballer who played as a full back.

Playing career
Jones began his career with Astor Institute in the Plymouth area but had to wait until 1947 to play for Football League Second Division club Plymouth Argyle due to the Second World War. He made his debut against Coventry City in May 1947 and would go on to virtually monopolize the left back position for the following 10 years. Described as consistent, reliable, and honest, Jones would go on to make 441 appearances for the Pilgrims in all competitions, scoring two goals. After a distinguished career with the club, he moved into non-league football with St Austell at the age of 37. During the Sixties he ran a fish and chip shop at Challaborough near Plymouth. Little else is known about him after his retirement.

Honours
Football League Third Division South
 Winner (1): 1951–52

References

External links
 Greens on Screen
 Argyle Review
 All England & Wales, Death Index, 1916-2007

English footballers
Association football central defenders
Plymouth Argyle F.C. players
Footballers from Plymouth, Devon
1920 births
English Football League players
1990 deaths